Wolf ticket may refer to:

 Wolf ticket (Russia), a document (personal identification, diploma) of incomplete or discrimination character
 "Wolf Tickets", a track on the album Play Me or Trade Me by P-Funk spinoff group Parlet
 "Wolf Tickets", a track on the album Game Related by American rap group The Click
 "Wolf Tickets", a track on the album Same Difference by Swedish metal band Entombed